Cosmic Slop Shop was an American hip hop group from Oakland, California. The group was composed of Antron "Big Lurch" Singleton, Marvin "Doonie Baby" Selmon and Ricardo "Rick Rock" Thomas. Their single "Sinful" from their only studio album Da Family was a minor hit in 1998, which peaked at #66 on the Billboard Hot R&B/Hip-Hop Songs chart and #18 on the Hot Rap Songs chart in the US.

History
Doonie Baby, Big Lurch and Rick Rock met at Slop Shop Studios in the San Francisco Bay Area and formed Cosmic Slop Shop, condensing the studio's name with Cosmic Slop, the 1973 album by Funkadelic. The group released their debut album Da Family in 1998 through MCA Records but, disappointed that it wasn't more successful, disbanded without recording a second album.

Rick Rock continued to produce, and, in 2002, he and Doonie Baby formed The Federation with rappers Stressmatic and Goldie Gold. In 2002, Big Lurch was incarcerated for cannibalizing his female roommate while he was high under the effects of PCP and was sentenced to life in prison in 2003.

Discography

Studio albums
Da Family (1998)

Singles
"Da Family" (1997)
"Sinful" (1998)

References

External links

Hip hop groups from California
Gangsta rap groups
American musical trios